The United States House Committee on Financial Services, also referred to as the House Banking Committee and previously known as the Committee on Banking and Currency, is the committee of the United States House of Representatives that oversees the entire financial services industry, including the securities, insurance, banking and housing industries. The Financial Services Committee also oversees the work of the Federal Reserve, the United States Department of the Treasury, the U.S. Securities and Exchange Commission and other financial services regulators.

The House Committee on Financial Services is considered to be one of the House's most powerful committees.

It is currently chaired by Republican Patrick McHenry from North Carolina, having assumed office in 2023. He previously served as the committee's Ranking Member. The Ranking Member is Democrat Maxine Waters from California, who previously chaired the committee under a Democrat majority in the House.

Jurisdiction 
Under the rules of the 113th Congress, the Financial Services Committee's jurisdiction includes:
 Banks and banking, including deposit insurance and Federal monetary policy
 Economic stabilization, defense production, renegotiation, and control of the price of commodities, rents, and services
 Financial aid to commerce and industry (other than transportation)
 Insurance generally
 International finance
 International financial and monetary organizations
 Money and credit, including currency and the issuance of notes and redemption thereof; gold and silver, including the coinage thereof; valuation and revaluation of the dollar
 Public and private housing
 Securities and exchanges
 Urban development

History
The Banking and Currency Committee was created on December 11, 1865, to take over responsibilities previously handled by the Ways and Means Committee. It continued to function under this name until 1968, when it assumed the current name.

Members, 118th Congress

Resolutions electing members:  (Chair),  (Ranking Member),  (R),  (D),  (amending rank)

Subcommittees

The Financial Services Committee operates with six subcommittees. The jurisdiction over insurance was transferred in 2001 to the then-House Banking and Financial Services Committee from the House Energy and Commerce Committee. Since that time it had been the purview of the Subcommittee on Capital Markets, Insurance and Government Sponsored Enterprises. But "with plans to reform Fannie Mae and Freddie Mac expected to take up much of that panel's agenda, insurance instead [was] moved to a new Subcommittee on Insurance, Housing and Community Opportunity [as of the 112th Congress]." In the 115th Congress, a new subcommittee on Terrorism and Illicit Finance was created, dedicated to disrupting the financing of terrorist organizations.

Current subcommittees

List of chairs

List of ranking members

Historical membership rosters

117th Congress

Resolutions electing members:  (Chair),  (Ranking Member),  (D),  (R),  (R),  (R)
Subcommittees

116th Congress

Sources:  (Chair),  (Ranking Member),  (D),  (R),  (R),  (R)

Subcommittees

115th Congress

114th Congress

Sources:  (Chair),  (Ranking Member),  (R),  (D)

113th Congress

112th Congress 

Source: https://financialservices.house.gov/uploadedfiles/113th_congress_membership.pdf

111th Congress 

Source: https://financialservices.house.gov/uploadedfiles/111thmembers.pdf

110th Congress

109th Congress

108th Congress

107th Congress

See also
 United States Senate Committee on Banking, Housing, and Urban Affairs
 List of current United States House of Representatives committees

References

External links

 House Committee on Financial Services Homepage (Archive) 
 House Financial Services Committee. Legislation activity and reports, Congress.gov. 
 House Financial Services Committee Hearings and Meetings Video. Congress.gov.

Financial Services
1865 establishments in Washington, D.C.
Organizations established in 1865